Charros, gauchos y manolas is a Spanish-language musical produced by Hollywood Spanish Pictures in 1930 and directed by Xavier Cugat.

Scenario
A bohemian painter, spurred by a magazine contest, creates a series of watercolor paintings of Spanish and South American cultural subjects. One by one, they come to life.

External links
 
 
 

1930 films
1930s fantasy comedy films
1930 musical comedy films
American fantasy comedy films
American musical comedy films
American black-and-white films
American musical fantasy films
1930s Spanish-language films
Spanish-language American films
1930s American films